Il Chapütschin is a mountain in the Bernina Range of the Alps, located between the Val Fex and the Val Roseg in the canton of Graubünden. On its eastern side it overlooks the Roseg Glacier.

References

External links
 Il Chapütschin on Hikr

Bernina Range
Mountains of Graubünden
Mountains of the Alps
Alpine three-thousanders
Mountains of Switzerland
Samedan
Pontresina